Liangxiang Univ. Town West station is a station on Fangshan Line of the Beijing Subway.

Station Layout 
The station has an elevated island platform.

Exits 
There are 3 exits, lettered A1, A2, and B. Exits A2 and B are accessible.

References

Beijing Subway stations in Fangshan District